Jan Krzysztof Krzesiak (born 6 July 1961 in Hańsk) is a Polish former wrestler who competed in the 1996 Summer Olympics.

References

1961 births
Living people
Olympic wrestlers of Poland
Wrestlers at the 1996 Summer Olympics
Polish male sport wrestlers
People from Włodawa County
Sportspeople from Lublin Voivodeship